The 2017 Island Games in Gotland is the fifteenth edition in which an association football tournament was played at the multi-games competition and the ninth Women's tournament.

Events

Medal table

Medal summary

Participants

Men's

 Isle of Man

Women's

 Isle of Man

Venues

 Gutavallen, Visby
 Hemse
 Fårösund

 Fardhem
 Säve, Visby
 Dalhem

 Stenkyrka
 Väskinde
 Visborgsvallen, Visby

References

 
Island Games
Football
2017